Semnan University of Medical Sciences is a public university in Semnan, Iran. The University has four faculties including medicine, dentistry, nursing, and rehabilitation and also three satellite schools in Damghan, Sorkheh and Aradan.

References

External links
 "Official Website of the Semnan University of Medical Sciences"

Semnan, University of Medical Sciences
Semnan, University of Medical Sciences
Education in Semnan Province
Buildings and structures in Semnan Province
1988 establishments in Iran